Brickellia atractyloides is a North American species of flowering plant in the family Asteraceae known by the common name spearleaf brickellbush. It is native to the desert regions of the southwestern United States (Arizona, California, Nevada, Utah) and northwestern Mexico (Sonora, Baja California).

Brickellia atractyloides is a shrub up to 50 cm (20 inches) tall. It produces many small flower heads with cream-colored or pale green disc florets but no ray florets.

Varieties
 Brickellia atractyloides var. atractyloides - Arizona, California, Colorado, Nevada, Utah
 Brickellia atractyloides var. odontolepis (B.L.Rob.) Jeps. - California, Baja California, Sonora

Flora of North America lists a third variety, var. arguta, listed here as a distinct species, Brickellia arguta, as accepted by The Plant List.

References

atractyloides
Flora of the Southwestern United States
Flora of Northwestern Mexico
Plants described in 1870